Telminostelma is a genus of plants in the  Apocynaceae, first described as a genus in 1885. It is native to Brazil and Bolivia in South America.

Species
 Telminostelma foetidum (Cav.) Fontella & E.A.Schwarz - Chuquisaca region in Bolivia
 Telminostelma roulinioides E. Fourn. - Brazil

formerly included
 Telminostelma carautanum, syn of  Cynanchum carautanum
 Telminostelma corymbosum, syn of  Cynanchum blandum
 Telminostelma ekmanii, syn of  Cynanchum caudiculatum

References

Asclepiadoideae
Apocynaceae genera